Ngapudaw is a town in the Ayeyarwady Region of south-west Burma (Myanmar). It is the seat of the Ngapudaw Township in the Pathein District. The town is divided into 4 wards and lies on the Ngawun river.

Etymology
The Burmese term  literally translates to "forest of short people." According to oral legend, this derives from the town being settled by short Karen people.

References

Populated places in Ayeyarwady Region
Township capitals of Myanmar